Glycosia tricolor, is a species of flower chafer native to India, Sri Lanka and Thailand.

Description
The average length of the adult beetle is about 2.7 cm. This species is known to show ultraviolet reflectance. This reflection is mainly carried out by the pigments contained within microtrichia or other setae.

The subspecies Glycosia tricolor malesiana has lateral marginal ridges of the pronotum which are inside up sharply edged towards the front corners. The dorsum black with white abdominal markings.

Species
Nine subspecies have been identified.

 Glycosia tricolor baliensis Jakl, 2009
 Glycosia tricolor carthausi (Flach, 1890)
 Glycosia tricolor latipennis Sakai, 1995
 Glycosia tricolor lombokiana Jakl, 2018
 Glycosia tricolor malesiana Pavicevic, 1984
 Glycosia tricolor palliata (Mohnike, 1871)
 Glycosia tricolor siberutensis Sakai, 1995
 Glycosia tricolor tricolor Olivier, 1789
 Glycosia tricolor vietnamica Miksic, 1982

References 

Cetoniinae
Insects of Sri Lanka
Insects of India
Insects described in 1789